Elliot Cabot (1899–1938) was an American stage actor. Born in Boston to Charles Mills Cabot and Caroline Elizabeth (nee Perkins) he attended Harvard University and Caius College, Cambridge University. He studied for the theatre under Frances Robinson-Duff, Laura Elliott and Moffat Johnston. Possessing good looks,  he started on Broadway in Six Characters in Search of an Author in 1922. He appeared in the following years in the 1920s in plays that were either based on novels or original for the stage. Later plays include Sun-Up (1923), The Great Gatsby (1926), The Silver Cord (1926), Coquette (1927).

Cabot appeared in one movie, a 1923 silent Puritan Passions.

Cabot died in New York after injuries from a fall.

References

External links
 
Elliot Cabot at IBDb.com
Elliot Cabot photo gallery (NY Public Library Billy Rose collection)
Elliot Cabot (City Museum of New York)

1899 births
1938 deaths
Male actors from Boston
Harvard University alumni
Alumni of Gonville and Caius College, Cambridge
Accidental deaths in New York (state)